The Diam Diam Era (Chinese: 我们的故事之沉默的年代) is a 2020 Singaporean comedy drama film directed by Jack Neo. Set in 1980s, it tells the story of the Lim family and their neighbours, now living in HDB flats. Through major policy changes and political climate in the era, they experience great changes in their lives and environment.

It was released on 26 November 2020 in Singaporean cinemas.

The film stars an ensemble cast, which includes Mark Lee, Richie Koh, Meixin Macy, Danny Lee, Henry Thia, Wang Lei, Suhaimi Yusof, Silvarajoo Prakasam, Benjamin Josiah Tan, Yap Hui Xin, Regina Lim, Ryan Lian, Tasha Low, and Charmaine Sei.

It is the third film in the Long Long Time Ago film series, after Long Long Time Ago (2016) and Long Long Time Ago 2 (2016). Another fourth film, titled The Diam Diam Era Two was released on 10 February 2021 during the Chinese New Year.

Synopsis
Continuing from Long Long Time Ago 2, the third film is set during the 1980s, spanning from early 1976 until the late 1980s. It follows the story of the Lim family's second generation and their neighbours in HDB flats, as they experience great changes in Singapore's environment, policies and livelihood.

After the death of his father Si Shu (Wang Lei), his mother Ah Ma (Ng Suan Loi) and his older sister Lim Zhao Di (Aileen Tan), Lim Ah Kun (Mark Lee) has turned over a new leaf and become a taxi driver. He often argued with his son, Lim Yong Xin and nephew, Phua Shun Fa (Richie Koh) due to differences in their views because of generation gap. During the time, Singapore was going through a number of reform policies, such as the forced closure of Chinese schools and the introduction of Singaporean elite system.

The film also focused on the troubled relationship between Yong Xin and Shun Fa as the former is an egoistic jerk, as he is an overachiever, especially in English and for this reason, looks down on the latter who's the opposite. Yong Xin even resorts to using Shun Fa as a scapegoat just to get out of trouble and save his reputation.

Ah Kun became dissatisfied with many of the government policies. He decided to speak out by setting a new opposition party. How will the story of their lives go?

Cast

Production
The film was originally titled as Not So Long Time Ago. The film budget is $2.5 million, filming lasted from April to May 2019. The film continues to showcase Singapore's multicultural society, and its history from the founding to becoming an advanced country.

The third and fourth film are set in the 1980s, and touched on politically sensitive topics, in particular several major policy changes implemented during the era, including the forced closure of Chinese schools and Nanyang University, the frustration among Chinese school students, the Singapore elite system, and opposition parties. It also explores the life views and differences between the younger and older generation, their different reactions towards the policies implemented during the era.

Regarding the subject matter, Jack Neo states that: “Although the subject is sensitive, it is part of history. It should be viewed with a correct attitude. Singaporeans should understand the history of their own country. We are not trying to deliberately touch on sensitive subjects, instead we just do not want to hide what happened in history."

Release 
The film held sneak peaks on 22 November 2020, was released on 26 November 2020 theatrically in Singapore.

Its sequel and the overall fourth film, The Diam Diam Era Two, was released on 10 February 2021 during the Chinese New Year.

References

External links
 Find cinema locations and schedule: Singapore
 

2020 films
Singaporean comedy-drama films
Hokkien-language films
2020s Mandarin-language films
Malay-language films
2020s English-language films
Singaporean multilingual films
Films shot in Singapore
Films set in Singapore
Films directed by Jack Neo
2020 multilingual films